Benjamin Clayton Mayes (March 16, 1945 – December 15, 1988) was an American football defensive end who played for the Houston Oilers of the American Football League, as well as the Jacksonville Sharks and the Portland Storm of the World Football League. He played college football at Drake.

College football career 
Mayes played for the Drake Bulldogs from 1964 to 1968, redshirting his first two years.

Professional football career

Houston Oilers 
Mayes was drafted by the Buffalo Bills of the National Football League in the fifth round of the 1969 NFL/AFL draft. However, he instead signed with the Houston Oilers, who played in the American Football League. He played five games with the Oilers at defensive end.

Jacksonville Sharks 
In 1974, Mayes signed with the Jacksonville Sharks of the World Football League. He played defensive end as well as right defensive tackle with the Sharks.

Portland Storm 
The Sharks folded after playing only fourteen out of twenty games during the 1974 season, and Mayes joined the Portland Storm, where he played defensive end.

Death 
Mayes died on December 15, 1988, in St. Petersburg, Florida, at the age of 43.

References 

1945 births
1988 deaths
African-American players of American football
American football defensive ends
American football defensive tackles
Drake Bulldogs football players
Houston Oilers players
Jacksonville Sharks (WFL) players
Players of American football from St. Petersburg, Florida
Portland Storm players